The Gukhak, was the sole recorded institution of higher learning in the Silla period of medieval Korean history. It provided training in the Chinese classics.  An earlier institution, the Taehak, had been founded in 372.

The Gukhak was established early in the Unified Silla period, in 682 (the second year of King Sinmun). During the reign of King Gyeongdeok (r. 742-765) its name was changed briefly to Daehakgam (대학감, 大學監) but reverted to Gukhak during the following reign of King Hyegong (r. 765-780). Like its counterpart in Tang China, the Gukhak was established primarily to train local officials in the Confucian classics and the composition skills requisite for the governance of an enlarged Silla state. The establishment of such an institution was increasingly critical by the 7th century with the maturation of Silla's bureaucratic system modeled upon that of Tang China.

The Gukhak was superseded by the Gukjagam, which was established in Gaegyeong in 992 during the Goryeo dynasty.

Entrance qualifications 
In the Gukhak, people who have less than an ambassador or who can have a degree even if they do not. Students were able to enter Gukhak from 15 to 30 years old. When they graduated from the Gukhak, they were given the title of Nama or 'Daema'. It is estimated that most of the students were six-dupum.

See also
Korean Confucianism
Gukjagam
Seonggyungwan
Guozijian, the Tang Dynasty model for the Gukhak.

References

Korean Confucianism
Education in Korea
Silla
Educational institutions established in the 7th century
682 establishments